Rancul Department is a department of Argentina in La Pampa Province.  The capital city of the department is Parera.

See also
Caleufú - town
 Ingeniero Foster - village
La Maruja - village
Quetrequén - village

References

Departments of La Pampa Province